Philip Moore Callow Kermode (21 March 1855 – 5 September 1932), was a Manx antiquarian, historian and naturalist.

Philip Moore Callow Kermode was born in Ramsey, Isle of Man to Rev. William Kermode (1815–1890) and his second wife Jane née Bishop (1818–1858). His sister was Manx poet Josephine Kermode who wrote under the nom de plume "Cushag". Neither married and Josephine kept house for him through his life. He was educated at King William's College, near Castletown in the south of the Isle of Man. He was admitted to the Manx Bar in 1878.

He was involved in the study of Manx history and archaeology throughout his life. He was a founding member of both the Manx Society in 1858, and later the Isle of Man Natural History and Antiquarian Society in 1879. He became the president of the latter in 1884. In 1922 he became the first director of the newly established Manx Museum. He was noted for his seriousness and work on inscriptions on Manx crosses. He wrote several books on Manx history and issues. He died on 5 September 1932 at his home in Douglas and was buried at Maughold Church.

A memorial to him was unveiled on the 22 July 1943 in Maughold Church. A memorial tablet is at his birthplace in Tower Street in Ramsey was unveiled in October 1950.

Works
  (120 pgs.)

See also
William Cubbon
Josephine Kermode
Thomas Allen (Manx author)
John Kneen
W. Clucas Kinley
Manx Museum

References

1855 births
1932 deaths
Manx historians
Manx culture
Manx people